Prioria, formally known as Prioria Robotics Inc., was an American corporation that originally focused on designing embedded sensor processing products and services. Established in Gainesville, Florida in 2003, Prioria transitioned from embedded systems to the design and development of unmanned aircraft. The company would go on to develop multiple Unmanned aircraft platforms as well as offering commercial services.

The first unmanned aircraft developed, sold, and supported the Maveric Unmanned Aerial Vehicle (also called an autonomous Micro Air Vehicle), while also maintaining a services division focused on defense focused research and development of embedded sensor processing systems. After Maveric, the Company developed Leviathan, a larger fixed wing UAS and the Hex Rotor. In 2014 the company transitioned to offering commercial services.

Prioria had a few key contributions to field of unmanned system:

 Maveric was the first drone to offer autonomous vision based collision avoidance processed on board the aircraft.
 Prioria was the first company to be Aerovironment in a Program of Record for small UAS. Though Aerovironment would win it back in the next cycle.

Notable Technologies

Bendable wing

Maveric benefited from a bendable wing technology that Prioria licensed from the University of Florida. Developed by Dr Peter Ifju

Onboard collision avoidance

Prioria developed an onboard collision avoidance system 

Prioria filed for bankruptcy in February 2018 after losing a major program of record for the Leviathan aircraft to Lockheed Martin in the fall of 2018.

References

External links
Prioria Inc.

Prioria Inc.
Defunct aircraft manufacturers of the United States
Companies established in 2003
Companies based in Florida
Electric vehicle manufacturers